The Samoa Hockey Association is the governing body of field hockey in Samoa, Oceania. Its headquarters are in Apia, Samoa. It is affiliated to IHF International Hockey Federation and OCF Oceania Hockey Federation.

Faamausili Taiva Ah Young is the president of Hockey Association of Samoa and Mitimiti Falesii is the general secretary.

See also
Oceania Hockey Federation

References

External links
 Samoa Hockey Association

National members of the Oceania Hockey Federation
Sport in Samoa